About Time is a 2018 fantasy romance South Korean television series starring Lee Sang-yoon and Lee Sung-kyung. It aired from May 21 to July 10, 2018, on tvN's Mondays and Tuesdays at 21:30 (KST) time slot.

Synopsis
Choi Michaela (Lee Sung-kyung) is an aspiring musical actress who has the special ability to see people's life spans. One day, while she's heading off to an audition, she becomes involved in a minor car accident and meets Lee Do-ha (Lee Sang-yoon), a chaebol son and the president of cultural foundation MK Entertainment. After an unexpected discovery that her life clock stops whenever she's with him, she becomes determined to keep him close at all costs. Things take an interesting and painful turn as the two begin to fall in love.

Cast

Main
 Lee Sang-yoon as Lee Do-ha
 Moon Woo-jin as young Lee Do-ha
 A chaebol son and president of the cultural foundation MK Entertainment. He seems rude and belligerent upon first meeting Michaela, but eventually warms up to and develops feelings for her as they spend time together, revealing the gentle and tender-hearted side of him. He receives counselling on a regular basis from a psychiatrist and close friend, Park Sung-bin, since he suffers from anxiety disorders and frequent panic attacks. His relationship with Michaela causes problems in his business and with his family, as well as his fiancé Bae Soo-bong, due to their arranged marriage.
 Lee Sung-kyung as Choi Michaela / Mika 
 A young and aspiring musical actress with the unfortunate fate of seeing the life spans of other people, including those around her. After initially beginning to work for Do-ha as his personal driver in order to remain by his side to extend her life span, she falls in love with him. However, she often feels guilty and conflicted of using him for her own benefit, and faces constant harassment from Bae Soo-bong to end their relationship.

Supporting

Lee Do-ha's family
 Jung Dong-hwan as Lee Seon-moon
 Chairman of MK Group. Lee Do-ha's cold-hearted father.
  as Lee Do-bin
 Kim Ji-wan as young Do-bin
 CEO of MK Group Hotel. Do-ha's older brother.
  as Kim Hye-young
 Do-bin's wife. An aloof and elegant rich woman who hides a secret.
 Jung Moon-sung as Yoon Do-san
 Lee Min-sung as young Do-san
 A travel writer. Do-ha and Do-bin's half-brother.

Choi Michaela's family
 Na Young-hee as Jin Ra-hee
 Choi Michaela's spoilt mother.
 Rowoon as Choi Wee-jin
 Choi Michaela's younger brother who falls in love with Sung-hee.
  as Choi Tae-pyung
 Choi Michaela's father who is incarcerated.

People around Lee Do-ha
 Im Se-mi as Bae Soo-bong
 The director of MJBC music magazine who is engaged to Do-ha and has had an unrequited love for him for several years. His relationship with Michaela makes her jealous and insecure about her place within his life and family.
 Tae In-ho as Park Sung-bin
 Do-ha's friend and psychiatrist, and Woo-jin's older brother.
 Kang Ki-doong as Park Woo-jin
 Do-ha's secretary and Sung-bin's younger brother.

People around Choi Michaela
 Han Seung-yeon as Jeon Sung-hee
 Choi Michaela's best friend who is currently working as an assistant director for Jo Jae-yoo and falls in love with Wee-jin.
 Kim Hae-sook as Oh So-nyeo
A reliable ally of Choi Michaela who secretly shares her same ability.

Others
 Kim Dong-jun as Jo Jae-yoo
 A strict musical director from Broadway who is well known for his genius abilities. He is hired by Do-ha to work on the musical production "Yeon-hui's Time Flows Backwards", with hopes of expanding his entertainment group and theatre business into China. Initially, he is very critical of Michaela's talents, but offers encouragement and insight occasionally as the two become friends over time.
 Jang Gwang as Mr. Park, Oh So-nyeo's boyfriend
 Oh Ah-rin as Yoon Ah-in

Special appearances
 Baek Ji-won as a wife (Ep. 1)
 Lee Dae-yeon as a husband (Ep. 1)
 Kim Kyung-nam as a police officer (Ep. 2)
 Kim Gyu-ri as Kim Joon-ah (Ep. 5-10)
 A Broadway actress and Do-ha's first love.
 Yu Xiaoguang as Zhang Qiang

Production
 The first script reading was held in February 2018.
 Actor Lee Seo-won, who was supposed to play the supporting role of Jo Jae-yoo, was pulled out of the production prior to airing due to criminal charges filed against him. He was replaced by Kim Dong-jun.

Original soundtrack

Part 1

Part 2

Part 3

Part 4

Part 5

Viewership

References

External links
  
 About Time at Studio Dragon 
 About Time at Story TV 
 
 

Korean-language television shows
TVN (South Korean TV channel) television dramas
2018 South Korean television series debuts
2018 South Korean television series endings
South Korean romantic fantasy television series
South Korean melodrama television series
Television series by Studio Dragon
Television series by Story TV